Abdou Halidou Douva (born February 2, 1986) is a Cameroonian footballer who is a midfielder who plays for US Douala.

Career
He began his career at Sahel FC in September 2006 transferred to Hungary club Diósgyőri VTK, later in January 2008 moved to Cameroon and signs a contract by Cotonsport Garoua. After one season with Cotonsport Garoua signed in September 2009 with league rival Union Douala.

Notes

1986 births
Living people
People from Maroua
Cameroonian footballers
Cameroonian Muslims
Association football defenders
Coton Sport FC de Garoua players